Col Saint Martin (el. 1500 m.) is a high mountain pass in the Alps in the department of Alpes-Maritimes in France.

It is traversed by the D-2205 highway.

The place has been crossed at the Tour de France road cycling race in 1973, 1975 and 2020, as well as at multiple editions of the Paris-Nice.

See also
 List of highest paved roads in Europe
 List of mountain passes

References 

Mountain passes of Provence-Alpes-Côte d'Azur
Mountain passes of the Alps